Winhöring is a municipality in the district of Altötting in Bavaria in Germany. The river Inn forms the municipality's southern border. The smaller river Isen flows through the municipality and then into the Inn.

References

Altötting (district)
Populated places on the Inn (river)